George W. Hallock House, also known as The Pillars, is a historic home located at Bath in Steuben County, New York.  It was built about 1847 in the Greek Revival style. Later additions and remodeling in the early 20th century added Colonial Revival elements. Built for prominent local resident and banker George W. Hallock, it was also home to his father-in-law Congressman William Spring Hubbell (1801–1873).  It currently serves as home to Southern Tier Legal Services.

It was listed on the National Register of Historic Places in 2004.

References

Houses on the National Register of Historic Places in New York (state)
Greek Revival houses in New York (state)
Colonial Revival architecture in New York (state)
Houses completed in 1847
Houses in Steuben County, New York
1847 establishments in New York (state)
National Register of Historic Places in Steuben County, New York